The New Adventures of Zorro can refer to:

The New Adventures of Zorro (1981 TV series) 
The New Adventures of Zorro (1997 TV series)